The Alexander Dukhnovych Theater (Teatr Aleksandra Duxnoviča, although the sign in the adjacent photo reads Tеатр Александра Духновича), located in Prešov, is the only Slovak theatre providing plays in the Rusyn language.

History

The Alexander Dukhnovych Theater was founded in 1945 as a Ukrainian national Theatre. In 1990 after Velvet revolution and fall of communism in Czechoslovakia it was renamed after a priest and social activist of the Rusyn nation Alexander Dukhnovych.

See also
 Rusyns 
 Paul Robert Magocsi

References

External links
 Alexander Duchnovič Theatre: Official site 

Theatres in Prešov
Tourist attractions in Prešov Region
1945 establishments in Slovakia
Rusyn culture